The Wiltshire Record Society is a text publication society in Wiltshire, England, which edits and publishes historic documents concerned with the history of Wiltshire.

History
In 1937, Ralph Pugh was the chief mover in a proposal to found the records branch of the Wiltshire Archaeological and Natural History Society. The Records Branch was established in 1939, and in 1967 it became the Wiltshire Record Society, an independent organisation. However, the numbering of the volumes published has remained continuous, the last volume published by the Records Branch being number 21 and the first volume under the new regime being number 22. The books published by both have all been bound in pale blue cloth and have the same size and format.

The work of the society is funded by the subscribing members, some of them being academic bodies and libraries, but most are private individuals. An annual general meeting is held in Wiltshire once a year, usually in June.

Presidents
1967–1982: R. B. Pugh
1982–2009: Christopher Elrington
2009– : Negley Harte

General editors
1962–1972: Christopher Elrington
1972–1976: Douglas A. Crowley
1976–1978: D. C. Cox
1979–1981: Janet H. Stevenson
1981–1982: vacant
1982–1988: J. L. Kirby
1988–1995: Jane Freeman
1995–2007: John Chandler
2007–2014: Virginia Bainbridge (jointly with Steven Hobbs from 2013)
2013– : Steven Hobbs (jointly with Virginia Bainbridge from 2013)

Publications
Since 1939, the Society and its predecessor the Records Branch have produced roughly one volume per year, the list of publications being as follows:

 Abstracts of feet of fines relating to Wiltshire for the reigns of Edward I and Edward II, ed. Ralph Pugh, 1939
 Accounts of the parliamentary garrisons of Great Chalfield and Malmesbury, 1645–1646, H. P. Pafford, 1940
 Calendar of Antrobus deeds before 1625, ed. R. B. Pugh, 1947
 Wiltshire county records: minutes of proceedings in sessions, 1563 and 1574 to 1592, ed. H. C. Johnson, 1949
 List of Wiltshire borough records earlier in date than 1836, ed. M. G. Rathbone, 1951
 The Trowbridge woollen industry as illustrated by the stock books of John and Thomas Clark 1804–1824, ed. R. P. Beckinsale
 Guild stewards book of the borough of Calne, 1561–1688, ed. A. W. Mabbs, 1953
 Andrews' and Dury's map of Wiltshire, 1773: a reduced facsimile, ed. Elizabeth Crittall, 1952
 Surveys of the manors of Philip Herbert, 5th Earl of Pembroke, 1631-2, ed. E. Kerridge, 1953
 Two sixteenth century taxation lists, 1545 and 1576, ed. G. D. Ramsay, 1954
 Wiltshire quarter sessions and assizes, 1736, ed. J. P. M. Fowle, 1955
 Collectanea, ed. N.J. Williams, 1956
 Progress notes of Warden Woodward for the Wiltshire estates of New College, Oxford, 1659–1675, ed. R. L. Rickard, 1957
 Accounts and surveys of the Wiltshire lands of Adam de Stratton, 1268–86, ed. M. W. Farr, 1959
 Tradesmen in early-Stuart Wiltshire : a miscellany, ed. N. J. Williams, 1960
 Crown pleas of the Wiltshire eyre, 1249, ed. C. A. F. Meekings, 1961
 Wiltshire apprentices and their masters, 1710–1760, ed. Christabel Dale, 1961
 Hemingby's register, ed. Helena M. Chew, 1963
 Documents illustrating the Wiltshire textile trades in the eighteenth century, ed. Julia de L. Mann, 1964
 The diary of Thomas Naish, ed. Doreen Slatter, 1965
 The rolls of the Highworth hundred 1275–1287, part 1, ed. Brenda Farr, 1966,
 The rolls of the Highworth hundred 1275–1287, part 2, ed. Brenda Farr, 1968
 The earl of Hertford's lieutenancy papers, 1603–1612, ed. W. P. D. Murphy, 1969
 Court rolls of the Wiltshire manors of Adam de Stratton, ed. R. B. Pugh, 1970.
 Abstracts of Wiltshire inclosure awards and agreements, ed. R. E. Sandell, 1971
 Civil pleas of the Wiltshire eyre, 1249, ed. M. T. Clanchy, 1971
 Wiltshire returns to the bishop's visitation queries, 1783, ed. Mary Ransome, 1972
 Wiltshire extents for debts, Edward I – Elizabeth I, ed. Angela Conyers, 1973
 Abstracts of feet of fines relating to Wiltshire for the reign of Edward III, ed. C. R. Elrington, 1974
 Abstracts of Wiltshire tithe apportionments, ed. R. E. Sandell, 1975
 Poverty in early-Stuart Salisbury, ed. Paul Slack, 1975
 The subscription book of Bishops Tounson and Davenant, 1620–40, ed. B. Williams, 1977
 Wiltshire gaol delivery and trailbaston trials, 1275–1306, ed. R. B. Pugh, 1978
 Lacock Abbey charters, ed. K. H. Rogers, 1979
 The cartulary of Bradenstoke Priory, ed. Vera C. M. London, 1979
 Wiltshire coroners' bills, 1752–1796, ed. R. F. Hunnisett, 1981
 Two justicing notebooks of William Hunt, 1744–1749, ed. Elizabeth Crittall, 1982
 Two Elizabethan women : correspondence of Joan and Maria Thynne, 1575–1611, ed. Alison D. Wall, 1983
 The register of John Chandler, dean of Salisbury, 1404–17, ed. T. C. B. Timmins, 1984
 Wiltshire dissenters meeting house certificates and registrations, 1689–1852, ed. J. H. Chandler, 1985
 Abstracts of feet of fines relating to Wiltshire, 1377–1509, ed. J. L. Kirby, 1986
 The Edington cartulary, ed. Janet H. Stevenson, 1987
 The commonplace book of Sir Edward Bayntun of Bromham, ed. Jane Freeman, 1988
 The diaries of Jeffery Whitaker, schoolmaster of Bratton, 1739–1741, ed. Marjorie Reeves and Jean Morrison, 1989
 The Wiltshire tax list of 1332, ed. D. A. Crowley, 1989
 Calendar of Bradford-on-Avon settlement examinations and removal orders, 1725–98, ed. Phyllis Hembry, 1990
 Early trade directories of Wiltshire, ed. K. H. Rogers and indexed by J. H. Chandler, 1992
 Star chamber suits of John and Thomas Warneford, ed. F. E. Warneford, 1993
 The Hungerford cartulary : a calendar of the earl of Radnor's cartulary of the Hungerford family, ed. J. L. Kirby, 1994
 The Letters of John Peniston, Salisbury architect, Catholic, and Yeomanry Officer, 1823–1830, ed. M. Cowan, 1996
 The Apprentice Registers of the Wiltshire Society, 1817–1922, ed. H. R. Henly, 1997
 Printed Maps of Wiltshire 1787–1844 : a selection of topographical, road and canal maps, in facsimile, ed. John Chandler, 1998
 Monumental Inscriptions of Wiltshire, ed. Peter Sherlock, 2000
 The First General Entry Book of the City of Salisbury, 1387–1452, ed. David R. Carr, 2001
 Devizes Division income tax assessments, 1842–1860, ed. Robert Colley, 2002
 Wiltshire Glebe Terriers, 1588–1827, ed. Steven Hobbs, 2003
 Wiltshire Farming in the Seventeenth Century, ed. Joseph Bettey, 2005
 Early Motor Vehicle Registration in Wiltshire 1903–1914, ed. Ian Hicks, 2006
 Marlborough Probate Inventories 1591–1775, ed. Lorelei Williams and Sally Thomson, 2007
 The Hungerford Cartulary, Part 2: a calendar of the Hobhouse cartulary of the Hungerford family, ed. J. L. Kirby, 2007
 The Court Records of Brinkworth and Charlton, 1544–1648, ed. Douglas Crowley, 2009
 The Diary of William Henry Tucker, 1825–1850, ed. Helen Rogers, 2009
 Gleanings from Wiltshire Parish Registers, ed. Steven Hobbs, 2010
 William Small's Cherished Memories and Associations, ed. Jane Howells and Ruth Newman, 2011
 Crown Pleas of the Wiltshire Eyre, 1268, ed. Brenda Farr and Christopher Elrington, 2012
 The Minute Books of Froxfield Almshouse 1714–1866, ed. Douglas Crowley, 2013
 Wiltshire Quarter Sessions Order Book, 1642–1654, ed. Ivor Slocombe, 2014
 Register of John Blyth, Bishop of Salisbury, 1493–1499, ed. David Wright, 2015
 The Churchwardens’ Accounts of St Mary’s, Devizes, 1633–1689, ed. Alex Craven, 2016
 Arundell Papers and Accounts 1745–1798, ed. Barry Williamson, 2017
 Letters of Henry Hoare of Stourhead, 1760–1781, ed. Dudley Dodd, 2018
Braydon Forest and the Forest Law, ed. Douglas Crowley, 2019
The Parish Registers of Thomas Crockford, 1561–1633, ed. John Chandler, 2020
The Farming Diaries of Thomas Pinniger, 1813–1847, ed. Alan Wadsworth, 2021

See also
History of Wiltshire
Wiltshire Archaeological and Natural History Society
Wiltshire Victoria County History
Wiltshire and Swindon History Centre

References

External links

History of Wiltshire
Small press publishing companies
Historical societies of the United Kingdom
Text publication societies
Archives in England
Heritage organisations in the United Kingdom
Book publishing companies of England
Companies based in Wiltshire
1939 establishments in England
Publishing companies established in 1939